The Plymouth X2S is the concept vehicle for the original Diamond Star Motors triplet vehicles, the Eagle Talon, the Plymouth Laser, and the Mitsubishi Eclipse. It is nearly identical to the 1st generation DSMs, except for a dual exhaust which exits out the rear bumper, and more aggressive-looking body panels. A concept convertible X2S was produced along with the coupe, but only the coupe made it into production. The Mitsubishi Eclipse Spyder was later added to the line-up in 1996.

Drivetrain
The Plymouth X2S is powered by the same turbocharged 4g63 engine that can be found in the Diamond Star Motors. It has a front-wheel-drive and manual transmission.

Current Location
The Plymouth X2S is currently being stored at the DaimlerChrysler Detroit Office Warehouse. It has been seen stored outside, in an L-shaped area on the south side of the building.

Photos
Few, if any real photos of the Plymouth X2S are known to exist. The only known photos are from the April 1988 issue of Road & Track Magazine.

External links
 Midwest Club DSM (Photos from Road & Track seen here.)

X2S